Radu Albot and Adam Pavlásek were the defending champions, but Albot decided not to participate, and Pavlásek played alongside Jan Šátral instead, but they lost in the first round to Michał Dembek and Viktor Kostin.

Michail Elgin and Mateusz Kowalczyk won the title, defeating Julio Peralta and Matt Seeberger in the final, 3–6, 6–3, [10–6].

Seeds

Draw

Draw

External links
 Main Draw
 Qualifying Draw

Poznan Open - Doubles
2015 Doubles